Ropa vieja ("old clothes") is a dish with regional variations in Latin America, the Philippines, and Spain. It normally includes some form of stewed beef and tomatoes with a sofrito base. Originating in Spain, it is known today as one of the national dishes of Cuba. The name ropa vieja probably originates from the fact that it was often prepared using food left over from other meals.

The dish's origins appear to have first arisen among the Sephardic Jews of the Iberian Peninsula, as a slow-cooked stew that was prepared to be eaten over the course of a traditionally observed Shabbat, a kind of cholent called "handrajos" (similar to the Spanish word "andrajos"). Eventually this dish spread to North Africa and to the Canary Islands of Spain.

The dish is believed to have been brought to the Americas by immigrants from the Canary Islands and was first reported to have been cooked in Cuba in 1857, but today is well known as a Cuban national dish.

Regional variations
 Canary Islands - Ropa vieja is served with both garbanzo beans and potatoes. Some versions of the dish in the Canaries include other meats, including chicken and pork.
 Colombia - the dish is known as both "ropa vieja" and "carne desmechada" and is often served with rice, fried plantains, or arepas.
 Cuba - Ropa vieja is well known as a national dish (most often served with rice and black beans), but famously was off the menu of many ordinary Cubans for a time during the Special Period of Cuban history, after the fall of the Soviet Union. While some Cubans improvised, substituting lamb or pork for beef during this time (or made special efforts to find beef to make the dish)  the dish became commonly available in Cuba again, starting in 2010 with the advent of independent and legal paladares in 2010. Ropa vieja is especially popular among Cuba's Jewish community. Ropa vieja in Cuba is often served with congri rice and fried plantains.
 In Nicaragua, the dish is called carne desmenuzada, or less commonly ropa vieja. It is made with green bell peppers, onions, garlic, salt, Worcestershire sauce, sugar, and mustard. It is usually served with white rice or alongside gallopinto (national dish of Nicaragua), and fried cheese, fried or boiled plantains.
 In the Philippines, ropa vieja includes fish sauce and is served with jasmine rice.
 Spain - ropa vieja is a make-do kind of dish in which a cook would stew leftovers in a sofrito base. Chickpeas are almost always included in the Spanish version of this dish.
 Venezuela - Like its neighbor Colombia, the dish is called both "ropa vieja" and "carne desmechada". Ropa vieja is a component of what is considered Venezuela's National Dish known as the Pabellón criollo.The dish is also often served as a filling for arepas as well as other dishes, and is commonly prepared using the herb annatto to provide a deeper color. 
 Other regions - The dish is popular in Honduras, Puerto Rico, and other parts of Latin America, as well as among immigrant communities in the United States.

See also

 List of beef dishes

References

Andalusian cuisine
Caribbean cuisine
Cuban cuisine
Latin American cuisine
Canary Islands cuisine
Philippine cuisine
Beef dishes
Sephardi Jewish cuisine
National dishes